Euxoa declarata, the clear dart, is a moth of the family Noctuidae. The species was first described by Francis Walker in 1865. It is found in Canada in Ontario, Quebec, New Brunswick, Nova Scotia, Prince Edward Island, British Columbia, Alberta, Saskatchewan, Yukon and Manitoba. It is found as far west as central Alaska. In the United States it is also found to Minnesota and North Carolina in the east and Arizona, New Mexico and California in the west.

The wingspan is 31–37 mm. Adults are on wing from July to September. There is one generation per year.

Subspecies
Euxoa declarata declarata
Euxoa declarata californica (California)

External links

Euxoa
Moths of North America
Moths described in 1865